Kenny Casanova (born May 1971) is an American professional wrestler and professional wrestling manager with international success in semi retirement, an author, and also a DJ. Kenny Casanova is best known as a pro wrestler on the North East circuit, whose career has led him to be inducted in the class of 2010 New England Pro Wrestling Hall of Fame.

Over his career he has wrestled, ring announced, acted as a color-commentator, and acted as a wrestling manager (persona/talent/character) for many international names. A few of the international names he has regularly managed and connected to are Luke Harper, Damien Sandow, King Kong Bundy, Nikolai Volkoff, Public Enemy's Rocco Rock, Tom Brandi,. Others include Demolition, H. C. Loc, Rocco Rock, Brutus "The Barber" Beefcake, and Japanese wrestler Shockwave The Robot. Casanova has had extensive pro wrestling feuds with The Patriot, Primo Carnera III, Tito Santana, and Jake Roberts.

In the late 90s through 2010, Kenny Casanova managed Kamala under a mask as "Kim Chee" for different promotions in the north east. This eventually led to Kenny ghostwriting Kamala's autobiography Kamala Speaks. The book helped successfully fund a kickstarter to help offset medical costs after Kamala lost both legs to diabetes in 2011.

Kenny Casanova has written/co-written several books for Walking On Hot Waffles Publishing (WOHW Publishing) including Kamala Speaks with Kamala, Struttin' & Cuttin with Brutus Beefcake, Vader Time with Big Van Vader, Sabu: Scars, Silence, & Superglue with Sabu (wrestler), and Mr. X - The Life Story of Dangerous Danny Davis with Dangerous Danny Davis.  He has also written a time travel novel entitled TAG, and he played a role in the publication of Brute Power- The Autobiography of Buggsy McGraw with Bugsy McGraw and Ian Douglass.

Wrestling career

Early years
Before becoming a pro wrestling personality, as a high school student in the spring of 1988 Page text., Kenny Casanova sold tickets and helped coordinate backstage for a wrestling promotion called WWWF. This initial experience was for an MS Fundraiser Show, put together by the legendary wrestling manager Captain Lou Albano.

Kenny Casanova's national professional wrestling career began initially as a ring announcer for the World Wrestling Federation in the summer of 1994. He also appeared on WWF Superstars of Wrestling and WWF All American Wrestling.

In fall 1994, Casanova attended a professional wrestling school in Elmira, New York with his friend Ring Of Honor and ECW wrestler H. C. Loc, as a trainer. Casanova trained under T.C. Reynolds (Doink the Clown) every weekend for the course of fifteen months, trying to learn every physical comedy spot he could. He also learned many spots and a great deal training under Tom Brandi, Bam Bam Bigelow, and "Superfly" Jimmy Snuka being fully immersed as a rookie in run by the USWF. Kenny's class included other north east professional wrestlers including H. C. Loc, Thornn (Sweet Pete Waters), "Hotbod" Todd Taylor, and "Danger" Dave DeJohn.  It was during this time that Casanova and his colleagues had partnered up with radio station WVCR-FM (in particular, DJ's and wrestling fans "Anarchist" Arn Abate and "Cap'n Lou-gee" Lou Graiff) in the Capital Region of New York for promotion of a number of upcoming New Breed Wrestling (NBW) events.

United States Wrestling Federation
The United States Wrestling Federation, operating out of Elmira New York was Kenny Casanova's first break. In the fall of 1995, Kenny Casanova managed and wrestled in his first team called "Damage Inc" (Danger Dave DeJohn and Hazard. He led Danger & Hazard to the USWF Tag Team Titles. Kenny Casanova also had a feud with Steve Corino and Tom Brandi in the USWF, but would later take on Salvatore Sincere (Tom Brandi's alter ego)as a key member of Camp Casanova in WWA.

He also managed "The Hollywood Escort" Sweet Pete Waters (Thornn), "Moleman" Chris Maxon (Papa Chill), H. C. Loc, The Milwaukee Mauler, King Kahlua and Salvatore Sincere.

Kenny started with USWF then left for a rival promotion called NBW, New Breed Wrestling in 1997 and then went on to wrestle for WWA wrestling, NEW wrestling, World Of Hurt Wrestling, TSW in VT and many other independents in the North East wrestling scene.

New Breed Wrestling
In April 1997, King Kong Bundy resurfaced in magazines when he joined Kenny Casanova's faction called "Camp Casanova" along with "Danger" Dave DeJohn and The Masked Maniac at times in USWF, NBW, and USA Power Pro Wrestling. In a match against "The Seven Foot Tall" Primo Carnera III, Bundy knee-dropped his opponent and then "Bundy-Splashed" him.

The impact actually broke the ring, leaving the two grapplers in a pit in the center of the squared circle. This independent footage was picked up by Pro Wrestling Illustrated.  Page text.  After this incident, a big battle royal to crown the first ever NBW Heavyweight Champ was scheduled to happen. However, it could not be a traditional over-the-top battle royal, as Bundy had destroyed the ring. Kenny Casanova quickly had it changed to a reverse battle royal, where the first man who could enter the ring would become the winner, Kenny Casanova's quick thinking led to his man, Iron Mike Sharpe as the winner, and first champion.

Kenny Casanova also ran his first stint in drag as "Kendra Casanova," wrestling as his own sister to obtain the NBW Ladies Championship beating Miss Patricia and Missy Hyatt on separate occasions for the title.

Eastern States Wrestling
While Kenny mostly managed and did wrestle in battle royals and tag team matches where little competition was provided for by his behalf, Kenny's first singles competition was in ESW on August 15, 1999 against his former ally John Diamond. He wrestled under a mask as "The Jive Turkey" Jimmy Giblets. Page text.

After more matches with the ESW, Kenny Casanova held the Battle Royal Championship as well as the ECW Woman's Title in Eastern States Wrestling. It was also in ESW that Kenny Casanova added a karaoke gimmick to his character, singing at ringside during intermission, and sometimes as his own entrance to the ring.

World of Hurt Wrestling
Kenny Casanova was primarily a manager in WOHW, a federation out of Upstate NY from 1999 - 2003 with good coverage in Pro Wrestling Illustrated magazines.

He was aligned with Dave "Danger" DeJohn and feuded with him off and on for the entire run of the federation. Here he held the woman's title on several occasions, as Kendra Casanova, beating Miss Deville, Barbie, and Kayla Sparks. His first tag team to find WOHW gold was Damage Inc, Danger & Mike Hardy, and H. C. Loc. He also managed Camp Casanova under "Old School Revolution"; a breakdance type gimmick, with members including Brodie Lee, Shana, Miss Deville, and Buttery Bert Williams.

Kenny also headed up a group called The Pie Mafia; a mysterious group of wrestlers grabbed last second from the locker room to do unscripted run-ins to hit unsuspecting wrestlers in the faces with pies, during their matches.

New Millenium Wrestling
Managed Chip Stetson to the championship, as well as tag teamed with him. Kenny also managed Monkey Mulligan and The Pie Mafia.

Tri State Wrestling
Kenny Casanova was the play-by-play and also color commentator for TSW High Impact TV Show UPN in Vermont, and all over the country through syndication. Wrestling fans all over America tuned into TSW High Impact, Kenny Casanova was the voice that they heard from 2001-2004. He also was an acting manager of his group, "Camp Casanova."

Pro Wrestling Magazine features
Wrestle America FALL EDITION 1997
Wrestle America 2001 ANNUAL
Wrestle America 2002 ANNUAL
1996 PWI Wrestling Almanac ANNUAL
1997 PWI Wrestling Almanac ANNUAL
1998 PWI Wrestling Almanac ANNUAL
1999 Guide The Independents DECEMBER 1999
Wrestling Superstars DEC 2000 Edition

Wrestling Championships and accomplishments
Eastern States Wrestling
ESW Ladies Championship (1 time)

Genesis Wrestling
GENESIS Tag Team Championship (1 time) - with Marty "The Party" Vain

New Breed Wrestling
NBW Ladies Championship (1 time)

New England Pro Wrestling Hall of Fame
Class of 2010

World of Hurt Wrestling
WOHW Ladies Championship (1 time)

Bibliography

Nonfiction
Books published by Walking On Hot Waffles Publishing (WOHW Publishing):Kamala Speaks (2015) co-written with KamalaStruttin' & Cuttin (2018) co-written with Brutus BeefcakeMr. X - The Life Story of Dangerous Danny Davis (2018) with Dangerous Danny DavisSabu: Scars, Silence, & Superglue (2019) co-written with SabuVader Time (2019) co-written with Big Van VaderBrute Power (2019) written by Bugsy McGraw and Ian DouglassDon't Call Me Chico (2019) co-written with Tito Santana

FictionTAG (2016)Cactus Jack and the Beanstalk (2019) co-written with Mick Foley with art by Pete BregmanDemolition on Mars (2020) with art by Pete BregmanSabu vs. The Three Little Pigs'' (2020) with art by Pete Bregman

Awards
As a teacher, Kenny Casanova was awarded a 50k Fulbright Scholarship in 2007 from the Japanese Government to act as an American educational ambassador for their country. He spent 6 weeks in Japan, visiting many different schools in both Tokyo & Kumomoto, Japan.

References

External links 
Official website
Kenny Casanova Background
Interview with Kenny Casanova for Wrestling Clothesline
Kenny Casanova at OWW.com
WOHW Publishing
The DJ Service

1971 births
American male professional wrestlers
Living people